Graham Geldenhuys (born 6 November 1959) is a South African cricketer. He played in one first-class match for Border in 1984/85.

See also
 List of Border representative cricketers

References

External links
 

1959 births
Living people
South African cricketers
Border cricketers
Cricketers from East London, Eastern Cape